Kayrat Ermetov (born 23 May 1984) is a Uzbekistani alpine skier. He competed in the men's slalom at the 2006 Winter Olympics.

References

1984 births
Living people
Uzbekistani male alpine skiers
Olympic alpine skiers of Uzbekistan
Alpine skiers at the 2006 Winter Olympics
Alpine skiers at the 2003 Asian Winter Games
Alpine skiers at the 2007 Asian Winter Games
21st-century Uzbekistani people